Ribes thacherianum, with the common name Santa Cruz gooseberry, or Santa Cruz Island gooseberry, is a rare North American species of currant found only on one island off the coast of California.

Description
Ribes thacherianum is an erect shrub growing to a maximum height around 2.5 meters (over 8 feet). The stems are coated in soft light hairs and bristles, and many of the stem nodes bear hard spines. The leaves are 2 to 3 centimeters (0.8-1.2 inches) long and shallowly divided into five dully toothed lobes.

The inflorescence is made up of one or two flowers. Each flower has five reflexed pink sepals around a tube made up of smaller white petals. The stamens and stigmas protrude from the corolla. The fruit is a purple berry about 7 millimeters wide which is covered densely in bristles and hairs.

Distribution
Ribes thacherianum is endemic to Santa Cruz Island, one of the northern Channel Islands of California, and within Channel Islands National Park. It grows in the pine woodlands of the coastal ravines.

References

External links
Jepson Manual Treatment - Ribes thacherianum
California Native Plant Society Rare Plant Profile: Ribes thacherianum
Ribes thacherianum - Calphotos Photo gallery, University of California

thacherianum
Endemic flora of California
Natural history of the California chaparral and woodlands
Natural history of the Channel Islands of California
~
Natural history of Santa Barbara County, California
Plants described in 1936
Taxa named by Willis Linn Jepson